Thomson Hankey (15 June 1805 – 13 January 1893) was a British merchant, a banker and a Liberal Party politician.

Hankey was the son of Thomson Hankey from Portland Place in London, and his wife Martha, the daughter of Benjamin Harrison from Clapham Common. He became a merchant in the City of London and a director the Bank of England, serving first as its Deputy Governor and then as its Governor from 1851 to 1853. In June 2020 the Bank of England issued a public apology for the involvement of Hankey, amongst other employees, in the slave trade following the investigation by the Centre for the Study of the Legacies of British Slave-ownership at UCL.

At the 1852 general election, Hankey unsuccessfully contested the borough of Boston in Lincolnshire.
He then contested the by-election in June 1853 for the City of Peterborough, where he lost by a margin of 21 votes (out of a total 451) to the Liberal George Hammond Whalley.
Whalley had been returned for Peterborough at a by-election in December 1852, but an election petition was lodged and his election was subsequently declared void on 8 June 1853 on the grounds that Whalley had been complicit in the "treating" of voters. After his second by-election win, a further petition was lodged, and a committee of the House of Commons found that Whalley's election was invalid, because he had been disqualified as a result of the previous void election. The seat was therefore awarded to Hankey, who was declared duly elected on 14 August 1853.

Hankey was re-elected in 1857, 1859 and 1865, but was defeated at the 1868 general election by the Liberal William Wells. He was re-elected in 1874,
but was defeated in 1880. His name was discussed in early 1882 as a possible candidate for any future vacancy in Peterborough, but when Hampden Whalley resigned in June 1883, Hankey did not contest the resulting by-election, and did not stand again thereafter.

He was also a Justice of the Peace (JP) for Middlesex, Kent and the City of London, and a member of Commission of lieutenancy for the City of London.

He died on 13 January 1893, aged 88. In his later years, his advanced age prevented him from taking any active part in public life.

References

External links  

 
 

1805 births
1893 deaths
Governors of the Bank of England
Liberal Party (UK) MPs for English constituencies
UK MPs 1852–1857
UK MPs 1857–1859
UK MPs 1859–1865
UK MPs 1865–1868
UK MPs 1874–1880
Politics of Peterborough
Deputy Governors of the Bank of England
British slave owners
19th-century English businesspeople